Tony Jeter (born September 8, 1944) is an American former professional football player who was a  tight end in the National Football League (NFL).

Biography
Jeter was born Anthony John Jeter on September 8, 1944, in Steubenville, Ohio. He is the brother of former Green Bay Packers Pro Bowler Bob Jeter, and the uncle of Milwaukee Panthers men's basketball head coach Rob Jeter.

Career
Jeter was drafted by the Packers in the third round of the 1966 NFL Draft and later played two seasons with the Pittsburgh Steelers. He had also been drafted by the Oakland Raiders in the tenth round of the 1966 American Football League Draft.

He played at the collegiate level at the University of Nebraska-Lincoln.

See also

List of Pittsburgh Steelers players
List of family relations in American football

References

1944 births
Sportspeople from Steubenville, Ohio
Pittsburgh Steelers players
Players of American football from Ohio
American football tight ends
Nebraska Cornhuskers football players
Living people